The 1966 Irish Greyhound Derby took place during July and August with the final being held at  Shelbourne Park in Dublin on 6 August 1966.

The winner Always Proud won £2,000 and was trained by Gay McKenna and owned and bred by Albert Lucas.

Final result 
At Shelbourne, 6 August (over 525 yards):

Distances 
1½, neck  (lengths)

Competition Report
The fastest first round winners were the joint ante-post favourites, McAlinden cup winner Newrath Wonder and the Gay McKenna trained Always Proud, they won in 29.48 and 29.49 respectively, followed closely by 1965 Irish Greyhound Derby finalist Val's Prince in 29.60.

In the second round Val's Prince won in an extremely fast 29.10 and Always Proud recorded 29.19, but in a major shock Newrath Wonder was eliminated.

Vals Prince lost his semi-final to Newrath Dancer the litter brother to Newrath Wonder but still qualified for the final. The remaining two semi-finals went to Tiger Chief from Cairnville Chief and Always Proud from Can Trap. Gay McKenna's Monalee Champion went out at this stage but would become a major breeding success.

Always Proud the 5-4 favourite duly obliged in the final to seal a second successive victory for Gay McKenna. The brindle dog had been knocked out of the 1965 Irish Derby in the third round after which his English owner Albert Lucas put him with Gay McKenna. Failure a year later in the English Derby second round was put down to him being off-colour (sick) before he returned to Ireland. A brilliant three way battle ended with Always Proud beating Tiger Chief and Vals Prince. The Derby trophy was presented by Charles Haughey.

Val's Prince gained revenge on Always Proud later in the year when winning the Guinness 600 by three lengths from his rival.

See also
1966 UK & Ireland Greyhound Racing Year

References

Greyhound Derby
Irish Greyhound Derby